WVSR-FM (102.7 MHz) is a contemporary hit radio station serving the Charleston, West Virginia Metropolitan Statistical Area with an ERP of 50,000 watts. The station started out as a Top 40 station until 2004, when the station went with a Hot AC format, but due to lower ratings, the station reverted to the Top 40 format in early 2006. WVSR is owned by Bristol, Virginia-based Bristol Broadcasting Company, along with "twin stations" "Electric 94.9" in Greeneville, Tennessee, and "Electric 96.9"  in Paducah, Kentucky. The station targets active young adult females ages 18 to 34, according to Bristol Broadcasting. WVSR can deal with a tremendous amount of interference in the Flatwoods, West Virginia area from co-channel Froggy 102.7, which broadcasts out of Mannington, West Virginia.

WVSR was CHR radio in the fall of 1982 and went to #1 with the ratings book in 1986. The format did not change as it was Top 40 during the 80's while owned by Beasley Broadcast Group from 1982 until the end of 1986 when Beasley sold to Ardman Broadcasting. At least 8 of the Beasley Broadcast Group people moved to Charlotte when Beasley Broadcast bought a station in that market. The branding of 14 years to take the station to the top of the market was changed with Bristol Broadcasting changing the station logo to Electric 102.

WVSR was formerly known as "Super 102".

External links
Official Electric 102.7 website

Charleston Radio Market @ Bristol Broadcasting.com
Electric 102 on MySpace

VSR-FM
Contemporary hit radio stations in the United States
Radio stations established in 1964